Pierre-Hugues Herbert and Nicolas Mahut were the defending champions, but Herbert chose not to participate this year. Mahut played alongside Édouard Roger-Vasselin, but they lost in the second round to Philipp Kohlschreiber and Fernando Verdasco.

Jamie Murray and Bruno Soares won the title, defeating Juan Sebastián Cabal and Robert Farah in the final, 4–6, 6–3, [10–6].

Seeds
All seeds received a bye into the second round.

Draw

Finals

Top half

Bottom half

References

External links
Main Draw

Men's Doubles